The Chaplet of Saint Michael the Archangel, also called the Rosary of the Angels, is a chaplet approved by Pope Pius IX in 1851.

Antónia d'Astónaco
Although some 19th- and 20th-century sources state that the chaplet started with Antónia de Astónaco or d'Astonac, wrongly reported as a Portuguese Carmelite nun who allegedly had a private revelation by Saint Michael the Archangel in 1750, it has been shown that the chaplet originated before the eighteenth century as a private devotion, originally rejected by the Church. Furthermore, it has been shown that there are no records referring to an Antónia d'Astónaco in the Carmelite archives or the Vatican archives, and the name is not Portuguese. Antónia d'Astónaco is first mentioned as a hypothetical source in an early nineteenth-century publication, and it is likely that she never existed.

Chaplet
The prayers are generally prayed with a chaplet, counting the prayers with it as one would do with a rosary. For those who would recite the Chaplet daily, Saint Michael reportedly promised his continual assistance and that of all the holy angels during life. Praying the chaplet is also believed gradually to defeat demons and gain a pure heart, thus delivering the petitioner from Purgatory. These blessings extend to the direct family.

The chaplet begins with an act of contrition. Then there are nine salutations, one for each choir of angels, each one followed by an Our Father and three Hail Marys. These are followed by four Our Fathers, honoring Saints Michael, Gabriel, Raphael and the Guardian Angel. The chaplet concludes with a prayer to Saint Michael.

 Sign of the Cross (In the name of the Father, and of the Son, and of the Holy Spirit. Amen.)

 The chaplet begins with the following invitation: O God, come to my assistance. O Lord, make haste to help me. Glory be to the Father, to the Son, and to the Holy Spirit, as it was in the beginning, is now and will be forever, time without end. Amen."

(Say one Our Father and three Hail Marys after each of the following nine salutations in honor of the nine Choirs of Angels)
1. By the intercession of St. Michael and the celestial Choir of Seraphim may the Lord make us worthy to burn with the fire of perfect charity. Amen.(Our Father, Three Hail Marys)

2. By the intercession of St. Michael and the celestial Choir of Cherubim may the Lord grant us the grace to leave the ways of sin and run in the paths of Christian perfection. Amen.(Our Father, Three Hail Marys)

3. By the intercession of St. Michael and the celestial Choir of Thrones may the Lord infuse into our hearts a true and sincere spirit of humility. Amen.(Our Father, Three Hail Marys)

4. By the intercession of St. Michael and the celestial Choir of Dominions may the Lord give us grace to govern our senses and overcome any unruly passions. Amen.(Our Father, Three Hail Marys)

5. By the intercession of St. Michael and the celestial Choir of Virtues may the Lord preserve us from evil and falling into temptation. Amen.(Our Father, Three Hail Marys)

6. By the intercession of St. Michael and the celestial Choir of Powers may the Lord protect our souls against the snares and temptations of the devil. Amen. (Our Father, Three Hail Marys)

7. By the intercession of St. Michael and the celestial Choir of Principalities may God fill our souls with a true spirit of obedience. Amen. (Our Father, Three Hail Marys)

8. By the intercession of St. Michael and the celestial Choir of Archangels may the Lord give us perseverance in faith and in all good works in order that we may attain the glory of Heaven. Amen.(Our Father, Three Hail Marys)

9. By the intercession of St. Michael and the celestial Choir of Angels may the Lord grant us to be protected by them in this mortal life and conducted in the life to come to Heaven. Amen.(Our Father, Three Hail Marys)

(Four Our Fathers. One in honor of each of the following leading Angels: St. Michael, St. Gabriel, St. Raphael and our Guardian Angel.)

O glorious prince St. Michael, chief and commander of the heavenly hosts, guardian of souls, vanquisher of rebel spirits, servant in the house of the Divine King and our admirable guide, you who shine with excellence and superhuman virtue deliver us from all evil, who turn to you with confidence and enable us by your gracious protection to serve God more and more faithfully every day.

Pray for us, O glorious St. Michael, Prince of the Church of Jesus Christ, that we may be made worthy of His promises.

Almighty and Everlasting God, Who, by a prodigy of goodness and a merciful desire for the salvation of all men, has appointed the most glorious Archangel St. Michael Prince of Your Church, make us worthy, we ask You, to be delivered from all our enemies, that none of them may harass us at the hour of death, but that we may be conducted by him into Your Presence. This we ask through the merits of Jesus Christ Our Lord. Amen.

Promises
Saint Michael purportedly promised to those who recite these nine salutations, every day:

 That they will enjoy his continued assistance during this life and also after death, in purgatory.

 They will be accompanied by all the angels and will be, with all their loved ones and relatives freed from Purgatory.

Indulgences

The indulgences granted by Pope Pius IX were superseded by the 1968 Enchiridion Indulgentiarum. Although the chaplet is not specifically mentioned in either the Enchiridion or the later Directory on Popular Piety and the Liturgy, the Enchiridion provides:
 "35. Use of Articles of Devotion. (Verbatim follows:) “The faithful, who devoutly use an article of devotion (crucifix or cross, rosary, scapular or medal) properly blessed by any priest, obtain a partial indulgence..." and
 "54. Veneration of the Saints.  Partial indulgence granted to those who on the feast of any Saint recite in his honor the oration of the Missal or any other approved by legitimate Authority."

See also
 Saint Michael in the Catholic Church
 Scapular of Saint Michael the Archangel
 Novena to Saint Michael

References

External links

 site with the Chaplet
 EWTN Chaplet of Saint Michael Video

Roman Catholic prayers
Michael (archangel)
Carmelite nuns
Angelic visionaries
18th-century Portuguese nuns
Prayer beads
Rosary
Spiritual warfare